Barlowe is a British surname. Notable people with the surname include:

Arthur Barlowe, English explorer
Wayne Barlowe (born 1958), science fiction and fantasy painter

Fictional characters:
Beverly Barlowe, a character on the television series Eureka
Barlowe, a main character in the videogame Castlevania: Order of Ecclesia

See also
Barlow (surname)
Bartow (name)